Kesbewa Urban Council is the local authority for the city of Kesbewa and surrounding suburbs in Sri Lanka.

The vision of the council as stated on their website is:

History

In 1987, a new local government system called Pradeshiya Sabha was introduced. The jurisdiction of a Pradeshiya Sabha was mostly confined to a Divisional Secretariat, and accordingly the Kesbewa Pradeshiya Sabha was incorporated with effect from 1 January 1988. The Pradeshiya Sabha functioned in accordance with the provisions of the Pradeshiya Sabha Act No. 15 of 1987.

With the rapid urbanisation of the Kesbewa area, the Kesbewa Urban Council and the Boralesgamuwa Urban Council were incorporated as two Local Government Institutions with effect from 15 April 2006 through a Special Gazette Notification No. 1426/15 dated 4 January 2006.

Geography

Kesbewa Urban Council is situated in Colombo District, south east of the city of Colombo.

The council area is bounded on the north by the Colombo-Avissawella main road (A4) and the Maharagama Urban Council boundary. It is bounded on the east by Polgasowita - Kottawa main road and Homagama Pradeshiya Sabha boundary. It is bounded on the south by the Bolgoda Lake. It is bordered to the west by the Dehiwala-Mount Lavinia Municipal Council and Boralesgamuwa Urban Council.

Grama Niladhari Divisions

The council comprises 55 Grama Niladhari Divisions.

Demographics

In 2018, the council had a population of 192,630, with 141,065 registered voters and 49,478 households.

External links 
 Urban Development Authority - Kesbewa Zoning Plan
 Ward Map of Kesbewa Urban Council - Colombo District

References

Local authorities in Western Province, Sri Lanka
Urban councils of Sri Lanka
1988 establishments in Sri Lanka